The American International Yellow Jackets men's ice hockey team is a National Collegiate Athletic Association (NCAA) Division I college ice hockey program that represents the American International College. The Yellow Jackets are a member of Atlantic Hockey. They play at the MassMutual Center in Springfield, Massachusetts.

History
AIC began its varsity program in 1948, playing a modest schedule for the first dozen years of its existence, building the program under William Turner before he handed it off to Joe Bucholz. In 1961 the Yellow Jackets joined with 27 other eastern schools (mostly in New England) to form ECAC Hockey. AIC finished near the bottom for three seasons and in 1964 it was decided that the conference was too unwieldy to continue and was split into two divisions. The Yellow Jackets joined the lower division, becoming a founding member of ECAC 2.

American International had some success when Turner returned to take over, winning the conference tournament in 1969, but dipped slightly after his retirement in 1970. When Paul Thornton took over in 1974 AIC saw a resurgence and by the late 1970s had returned to the ECAC 2 Tournament but after his departure in 1978 the program slumped once more.

In 1984 the Division II ice hockey level collapsed and sent almost all teams at that level down to Division III. AIC followed along and when ECAC 2 split the Yellow Jackets stayed with the eastern side, joining the new ECAC East. In all that upheaval it was not lost that the American International had gotten its sixth head coach since 1970 but they were finally able to find someone willing to stick around in Gary Wright.

Wright's time with AIC began fairly successfully with the team earning its first 20-win season in his fourth year. The next season, 1989, saw the Yellow Jackets pace the ECAC East with 20 wins and set a program record with 24 wins overall but they faltered in the conference tournament and failed to make the D-III National championship. The next year the team was able to regain some of their success by winning the ECAC East title, their first conference championship in 21 years, but they were left out of the National Tournament due to a relatively poor overall record (only eight teams made the tournament and league champions did not receive an automatic berth). AIC continued to play well in the mid-90s but in 1995 the program declined sharply, dropping from 14 to 4 wins and remained in the ECAC East cellar for the rest of its time there.

In 1998 the MAAC began sponsoring an ice hockey conference and AIC joined as an affiliate member, returning to the top tier of college hockey. In their first year back the Yellow Jackets posted a decent record, finishing 5th in the 8-team field but bowed out in the first round of the conference playoffs. After that brief glimpse of success, however, AIC fell to the bottom of the conference and remained there for almost the next 20 years. Even with several new teams joining the conference and the division's reworking into Atlantic Hockey AIC could finish no better than 9th from 2000 through 2017 with the lone exception coming in 2006 when Atlantic Hockey had only 8 league members.

AIC made the conference tournament every years because Atlantic Hockey structured its conference tournament to include every team, but even then the Yellow Jackets could only twice win the 9 vs 8 play-in game and lost every other round it participated in. AIC lost 20 games for 13 consecutive seasons and 18 out of 19 years after 1999 but through it all Gary Wright stayed on to hold the program together. He eventually retired in 2016, being the longest-tenured coach at the time of his retirement and held the record for the most career losses with a single program, but his legacy with AIC went beyond wins and losses.

A new era at AIC began in 2016 with Eric Lang as the new head coach. After a poor but familiar first season AIC posted its best record since 1993 with 15 wins, finishing 8th in Atlantic Hockey and winning its first conference tournament round in over a decade. The following year AIC won its first ever conference championship and, after winning its first conference tournament at the Division I level, made its first appearance in an NCAA Championship. As the lowest-seeded team, AIC played against #1 St. Cloud State and, despite being outshot 34-13 in the game, won the match. The Yellow Jackets season ended after losing the next game but they had already produced the best season in the history of program by a mile.

AIC again won the Atlantic Hockey championship in 2020, however, before the team played its first postseason game the NCAA cancelled all remaining contests and tournaments due to the coronavirus pandemic.

Season-by-season results

Roster
As of September 15, 2022.

|}

All-time coaching records 
As of April 1, 2023

Awards and honors

NCAA

Individual Awards

Derek Hines Unsung Hero Award
Jared Pike (2020)

All-Americans
AHCA First Team All-Americans

2020–21: Brennan Kapcheck, D

AHCA Second Team All-Americans

2018–19: Blake Christensen, F

MAAC

Individual Awards
Coach of the Year
 Gary Wright: 1999

All–Conference
First Team

 2000–01: Aaron Arnett, D

Second Team

 1998–99: Chance Thede, G; Mike Sowa, F

Rookie Team

 2000–01: Guillaume Caron, F; Trent Ulmer, F

Atlantic Hockey

Individual Awards

Player of the Year
 Brennan Kapcheck: 2021
 Chris Theodore: 2022

Rookie of the Year
 Brennan Kapcheck: 2018

Best Defenseman
 Brennan Kapcheck: 2021
 Zak Galambos: 2022

Best Defensive Forward
 Chris Dodero: 2021
 Jake Stella: 2022

Individual Sportsmanship Award
 Justin Cole: 2021

Regular Season Scoring Trophy
 Blake Christensen: 2019

Regular Season Goaltending Award
 Zackarias Skog: 2020
 Jake Kucharski: 2022
 Jarrett Fiske: 2023

Team Sportsmanship Award
 2014, 2015, 2016

Coach of the Year
 Eric Lang: 2019, 2020, 2022

Most Valuable Player in Tournament
 Zackarias Skog: 2019
 Justin Cole: 2021
 Blake Bennett: 2022

All–Conference
First Team

 2003–04: Guillaume Caron, F
 2004–05: Frank Novello, G
 2018–19: Brennan Kapcheck, D; Blake Christensen, F
 2019–20: Zackarias Skog, G; Brennan Kapcheck, D; Blake Christensen, F
 2020–21: Brennan Kapcheck, D; Tobias Fladeby, F
 2021–22: Zak Galambos, D; Chris Theodore, F
 2022–23: Blake Bennett, F

Second Team

 2012–13: Ben Meisner, G; Adam Pleskach, F
 2019–20: Patrik Demel, D
 2020–21: Stefano Durante, G; Elijah Barriga, F; Chris Dodero, F
 2021–22: Jake Stella, F
 2022–23: Jarrett Fiske, G; Brian Kramer, D

Third Team

 2006–07: Jeremr Tendler, F
 2007–08: Jeremr Tendler, F
 2011–12: Adam Pleskach, F
 2012–13: Jeff Ceccacci, D
 2013–14: Jon Puksar, F
 2017–18: Jānis Jaks, D
 2019–20: Martin Mellberg, F; Hugo Reinhardt, F
 2021–22: Jake Kucharski, G
 2022–23: Jordan Biro, F

Rookie Team

 2009–10: Adam Pleskach, F
 2012–13: Chris Porter, F
 2013–14: David Norris, F
 2017–18: Stefano Durante, G; Brennan Kapcheck, D
 2020–21: Nico Somerville, D; Aaron Grounds, F; Eric Otto, F
 2021–22: Luis Lindner, D

Statistical leaders
Source:

Career points leaders

Career goaltending leaders

GP = Games played; Min = Minutes played; W = Wins; L = Losses; T = Ties; GA = Goals against; SO = Shutouts; SV% = Save percentage; GAA = Goals against average

Minimum 30 games played

Statistics current through the start of the 2021–22 season.

Yellow Jackets in the NHL
As of July 1, 2022.

WHA
One player was a member of the WHA.

Source:

Olympians
This is a list of American International alumni who played on an Olympic team.

See also
American International Yellow Jackets

References

External links